Dolly Parton: Here I Am is a 2019 British biographical documentary film, directed by Francis Whately. The film offers a look into the life and musical career of Dolly Parton, which is told through interviews with friends, companions, and the artist herself.

References

External links 
 

2019 films
2019 television films
British television documentaries
2019 documentary films
Biographical documentary films
Documentary films about women in music
Dolly Parton
2010s English-language films
2010s British films